Dimitar Mladenov (born 12 March 1962) is a Bulgarian former professional footballer who played as a defender.

References

External links

1962 births
Living people
Bulgarian footballers
Bulgaria international footballers
Botev Plovdiv players
FC Maritsa Plovdiv players
First Professional Football League (Bulgaria) players
Association football defenders